The Chinese Taipei Rugby Football Union (CTRFU)) is the rugby union governing body in the Taiwan (Republic of China). Because of Taiwan's complex relationship with the People's Republic of China, the union competes under the name Chung Hua Taipei or "Chinese Taipei", rather than as either Taiwan or the Republic of China.

History
The Taiwan Provincial Rugby Committee was founded in 1935, and joined the International Rugby Football Board (now World Rugby) in 1986. Concerning its foundation, the efforts of Ke Zhi-Zhang (a.k.a. Ka Shi-Sho:柯子彰 in Japan) cannot be overlooked.

Teams
Chinese Taipei national rugby union team – the men's national rugby union team
Chinese Taipei women's national rugby union team – the women's national rugby union team
Chinese Taipei national rugby sevens team – the men's national 7's team

See also
Rugby union in Taiwan
Sport in Taiwan

External links
Chinese Rugby Football Association
Chinese Taipei on world.rugby

References

Rugby union in Taiwan
Taiwan
Rugby
Taiwan
1935 establishments in Taiwan